were a Japanese idol rock girl group under Platinum Passport. Their first major single, "Shoujo Hikou", reached number 1 at the Oricon charts on May 16, 2011. They also are producing a group called Puchi Passpo (ぷちぱすぽ☆), a 5-girl group heading to be the representative group of Tokyo Olympics in 2020.

PASSPO☆ announced on May 19, 2018 on their official website that the group will officially disband on September 22, 2018.

History 

 2009 - The start of a new idea
The group formed in 2009 after ten girls were selected from the Minna de Tsukuru Idol Unit contest in Akihabara. The group was named "PASSPO☆" soon after and they use the theme of travel in the group's concept. For example, the members of group are called "the crew" while the leader is called "captain" and the sub-leader is called "chief purser" with each member having their own color. Meanwhile, their live events are called "flights" while those who are attendance are usually called "the passengers". Also, their songs incorporate the travel theme and the group releases three versions of their singles, each name Business Class, First Class, and Economy Class, with different material inserted in each version.

 2010 - The consolidation of the "stewardess of Japan"
PASSPO☆ released their first single in March 2010, entitled "Let It Go!!", under the indie label Jolly Roger. A month later, PASSPO☆ went on their first tour named "PasTour". The group also starred in their own variety show, Attention Please☆ on TV Kanagawa. By the end of the year, the group released their first album, entitled TAKE☆OFF.

 2011 - Shoujo Hikou, records and graduations.
At an event in January 2011, PASSPO☆ announced that they signed to the label Universal Japan. The group made their major debut four months later with the single "Shoujo Hikou". Their first single reached #1 in the Oricon chart (making them the first idol group in Japan to debut at #1). They also released their first major album, entitled CHECK-IN, in December. However, Sakuma Kaho was the first member to graduate as she graduated from the group on December 30 at the group's last live show at Zepp Tokyo.

 2012
On June 25, 2012, Passpo took part in Yubi Matsuri, an idol festival produced by Rino Sashihara from AKB48. The concert was held at Nippon Budokan before a crowd of 8,000 people and featured such girl groups as Idoling!!!, Shiritsu Ebisu Chugaku, Super Girls, Tokyo Girls' Style, Nogizaka46, Buono!, Momoiro Clover Z, and Watarirouka Hashiritai 7.

 2013 - Variety Year
From April 6 to September 28, Passpo aired a variety show with Jinbo Satoshi on TV Tokyo called Passpo no Shaku-Uma TV, when the 9 girls are dressed as baseball players, and the famous actor was the teacher. Passpo sold their highest number of singles (5), with the highest amount of selling in the history of the group (around 88,500 copies). On October 16, "Growing Up" was released. "Growing Up" was a 'mature' for the group, with a friendship theme. With the videoclip, the nine girls won their individual videos about the most important moments for them (Passpo is also known in Japan for its strong sense of friendship).

 2014 - Perfect Sky and graduation
At the beginning of the year 'Okunaka Makoto left the group, leading to their "official house" in Shibuya, the SHIBUYA-AX, being closed. "Perfect Sky" was released on March 26. On July 2, Passpo started a new show called "Muriyari Passpo" (Forced Passpo), when the girls will show the 'natural' side of the group.

After "Perfect Sky", on August 20, they released "Himawari" and a new digital single, called "Shiny Road". Their fifth album, Tracks, along with a single of the same name, was released on December 10. For New Year Passpo played the Tokyo Dome City Hall to end their National Tour (in celebration of the 5th year of the group). In a 6-hour non-stop show they performed all 68 of their singles to more than 3,200 people. They sang 20 songs in a medley, and 48 songs are played in full, without intermission. Band member Okunaka Makoto announced she was leaving the group after the show.

Members

Former members

Discography

Singles

Albums

DVDs

Books

Photobooks
 [2010.12.06] Cielo Passpo Official Photo Book

Others
 [2011.11.15] Passpo☆ Official Book Attention Please Visual (ぱすぽ☆オフィシャルブック　ATTENTION　PLEASE　ビジュアル編)
 [2011.11.15] Passpo☆ Official Book Attention Please Character (ぱすぽ☆オフィシャルブック　ATTENTION　PLEASE　キャラクタｰ編)

References

External links

  
  (Nippon Crown) 
  

Japanese pop music groups
Japanese girl groups
Japanese idol groups
Avex Group talents
Universal Music Japan artists
Musical groups established in 2009
2009 establishments in Japan
2018 disestablishments in Japan
Musical groups from Tokyo
Musical groups disestablished in 2018